The Gentleman of San Francisco is a Tibetan-language film  by Tibetan director Tashi Wangchuk which premiered  in 2010 in United States. The film is about a Tibetan expatriate writer living in San Francisco Bay Area. 

This picture  also makes for  a powerful portrait of life of Tibetan immigrants in USA, and their struggles to keep their identity and values alive.

See also
Tharlo
Kundun
Tibetan-language film

References

Tibetan-language films